At least three ships of the French Navy have been named Aquilon

, a fifth rate ship, sunk by HMS Antelope in 1757
, a Téméraire-class ship of the line.
, a Téméraire-class ship of the line.

French Navy ship names